Warwick Hugh Anderson (born 10 December 1958), medical doctor, poet, and historian, is Janet Dora Hine Professor of Politics, Governance and Ethics in the Department of History and the Charles Perkins Centre, University of Sydney, where he was previously an Australian Research Council Laureate Fellow (2012–17). He is also honorary professor in the School of Population and Global Health, University of Melbourne. He is a fellow of the Australian Academy of the Humanities, the Academy of Social Sciences in Australia, the Australian Academy of Health and Medical Sciences and the Royal Society of New South Wales, from which he received the History and Philosophy of Science Medal in 2015. For the 2018–19 academic year, Anderson was the Gough Whitlam and Malcolm Fraser chair of Australian Studies at Harvard University. As a historian of science and medicine, Anderson focuses on the biomedical dimensions of racial thought, especially in colonial settings, and the globalisation of medicine and science. He has introduced anthropological insights and themes to the history of medicine and science; developed innovative frameworks for the analysis of science and globalisation; and conducted historical research into the material cultures of scientific exchange. His influential formulation of the postcolonial studies of science and medicine has generated a new style of inquiry within science and technology studies.

Early life and education
Anderson was born and educated in Melbourne, Australia, where he attended the University High School. His father, Hugh McDonald Anderson (1927–2017), was a leading folklorist and historian of Australian popular and literary culture, with more than forty books to his credit; his mother, Dawn Anderson, has written books on drama education and creativity.

Anderson graduated from the University of Melbourne Medical School with a Bachelor of Medicine, Bachelor of Surgery in 1983. During the medical course he conducted neurophysiology research, supervised by Ian Darian-Smith, which earned him a Bachelor of Medical Sciences (1980). He was an intern at the Royal Melbourne Hospital, and had paediatric training at the Royal Children's Hospital, Melbourne, and the John Radcliffe Hospital, Oxford. In the 1986 season he was the assistant doctor for the Footscray Football Club (now the AFL Bulldogs). From 1987, he worked in general practice in the inner west of Melbourne, which he continued intermittently until 1999. 
 
Anderson ("Dr. Androgen") was a co-presenter on the award-winning radio program "Spoonful of Medicine" (3RRR) from 1987–88.

Poetry
As a medical student, Anderson began writing and publishing poetry. More than forty poems have appeared in a range of leading journals in Australia and the US. His poetry collection, Hard Cases, Brief Lives (Adelaide: Ginninderra, 2011) was short-listed in 2012 for the Mary Gilmore Award of the Association for the Study of Australian Literature (ASAL).

History of medicine and science
Anderson completed a Doctor of Philosophy in the Department of the History and Sociology of Science at the University of Pennsylvania in 1992. His dissertation was on US colonial medicine and public health in the Philippines, and his advisor was Charles E. Rosenberg. Before moving to Sydney, Anderson held appointments at Harvard University (1992–95); the University of Melbourne (1995–2000); University of California, San Francisco and University of California, Berkeley (2000–2003); and the University of Wisconsin-Madison (2003–07). At Melbourne, he founded the Centre for Health and Society (1997), and helped to establish the Onemda VicHealth Koori Health Unit (1998). At Madison, he was chair of the Department of Medical History and Bioethics.

Anderson was the founding editor of Health and History (1998), and served as associate editor for the East Asian STS Journal and Postcolonial Studies. He served on the councils of the American Association of the History of Medicine (AAHM), the Australian and New Zealand Society for the History of Medicine, the Australian Society of Health, Law and Ethics, History of Medicine in Southeast Asia (HOMSEA), the Institute of Postcolonial Studies (Melbourne), and the Pacific Circle.

Anderson was awarded a fellowship from the John Simon Guggenheim Foundation (2007–08), and he was a Frederick Burkhardt Fellow of the American Council of Learned Societies (2005–06), which he held at the Institute for Advanced Study, Princeton. In 2013 he was a Whitney J. Oates Fellow at the Humanities Council, Princeton University and a John Hope Franklin Fellow at Duke University.

Among Anderson's key publications are:
 The Cultivation of Whiteness: Science, Health, and Racial Destiny in Australia (MUP 2002 & 2005, Basic 2003, Duke 2006). Awarded the W.K. Hancock Prize of the Australian Historical Association (2004) and the Basic Books Prize in the History of Science, Medicine, and Technology (2001). The research for this book was recognised in the award of the M.D. degree (by thesis) from the University of Melbourne (2002).
 Colonial Pathologies: American Tropical Medicine, Race, and Hygiene in the Philippines (Duke 2006 & 2008, Ateneo de Manila 2007). Awarded the Social Science Prize (2008) of the Philippines National Book Awards.
 The Collectors of Lost Souls: Turning Kuru Scientists into Whitemen (Johns Hopkins 2008). Awarded the NSW Premier’s General History Prize (2009), William H. Welch Medal of the AAHM (2010) and the Ludwik Fleck Award of the Society for Social Studies of Science (2010).
 Intolerant Bodies: A Short History of Autoimmunity, with Ian R. Mackay (Johns Hopkins 2014). Awarded the NSW Premier's General History Prize (2015).
 Unconscious Dominions: Psychoanalysis, Colonial Trauma, and Global Sovereignties, ed. with Deborah Jenson and Richard C. Keller (Duke 2011).
Additionally he is the author of more than 60 articles and book chapters.

Postcolonial studies of science and medicine
Anderson has published a number of manifestos for postcolonial approaches to explaining the globalisation of science and medicine, including: 
 Where is the postcolonial history of medicine? Bulletin of the History of Medicine. 1998; 72: 522–30
 Postcolonial technoscience. Social Studies of Science. 2002; 32: 643–58
 Postcolonial histories of medicine. In: Medical History: The Stories and Their Meanings, 285–307. Ed. John Harley Warner and Frank Huisman. Baltimore: Johns Hopkins University Press; 2004
 (With Vincanne Adams) Pramoedya’s chickens: postcolonial studies of technoscience. In: The Handbook of Science and Technology Studies, 3rd ed., 181–204. Ed. Edward J. Hackett, Olga Amsterdamska, Michael Lynch, and Judy Wajcman. Cambridge MA: MIT Press; 2007
 From subjugated knowledge to conjugated subjects: science and globalisation, or postcolonial studies of science? Postcolonial Studies. 2009; 12: 389–400
 Asia as method in science and technology studies. East Asian Science, Technology and Society Journal. 2012; 6: 445–51

Race and ethnicity in the global south
In 2011, the Australian Research Council (ARC) awarded Anderson a Laureate Fellowship, making him the first historian to receive this award and the only applicant from the humanities to receive a fellowship in the initial round. The fellowship supported comparative, transnational research in the history of ideas of race and human difference in the Global South. These studies involved collaborators from Brazil, New Zealand, and South Africa, and over the course of the fellowship supported six post-doctoral fellows.

References

1958 births
Australian medical historians
Fellows of the Academy of the Social Sciences in Australia
Fellows of the Australian Academy of Health and Medical Sciences
Fellows of the Australian Academy of the Humanities
Harvard University faculty
Living people
Melbourne Medical School alumni
Postcolonialism
Science and technology studies scholars
University of California, Berkeley faculty
University of California, San Francisco faculty
Academic staff of the University of Melbourne
University of Pennsylvania School of Arts and Sciences alumni
Academic staff of the University of Sydney
University of Wisconsin–Madison faculty